Kelayeh may refer to:
 Kelayeh-ye Olya
 Kelayeh-ye Sofla
 Kelayeh-ye Vosta